Wachuqucha (Quechua wachu furrow slice, ridge turned up by the plough between two furrows / row, qucha lake, hispanicized spellings Huachoccocha) is a lake in Peru. It is situated in the Apurímac Region, Andahuaylas Province, San Jerónimo District. Wachuqucha lies northeast of the lakes Suytuqucha and Quriqucha, and south of the lake Antaqucha.

See also
List of lakes in Peru

References

Lakes of Peru
Lakes of Apurímac Region